Amarjot Sandhu MPP (Punjabi: ਅਮਰਜੋਤ ਸੰਧੂ) is a Canadian politician. He is a Progressive Conservative member of the Legislative Assembly of Ontario who was elected in 2018 who represents the riding of Brampton West.

Amarjot Sandhu was born in Punjab, India. He arrived in Canada in 2008 as an international student and went to George Brown College in Toronto. He later became a realtor with Royal LePage in Brampton. Amarjot Sandhu is the Member of the Provincial Parliament for the riding of Brampton West and the Parliamentary Assistant to the Minister of Infrastructure. He was also the Chairman of the Standing Committee on Finance and Economic Affairs from 2019 to 2021. He is currently a member of the Standing Committee on Government Agencies and the Standing Committee on Procedure and House Affairs.

He is the first international student to be elected as a representative to the Legislative Assembly of Ontario. He currently resides in his riding of Brampton West with his wife and two kids.

Early and personal life 
Sandhu came to Canada as an international student and pursued his studies in Ontario. Even before immigrating to Canada, Sandhu always had a passion for politics and advocacy. As a student in Canada, he founded the International Students’ Federation. After graduation, he worked as a computer engineer and a network analyst. Later, he worked as a realtor in the community of Brampton before eventually being elected as a MPP.

Amarjot pursued his education graduating from George Brown College with a post-graduate in wireless networking program. It was while studying and working that Amarjot discovered his passion for politics as he aligned himself with conservative ideals and values he decided to volunteer with the party. While pursuing his education Amarjot had to work multiple jobs on the side such as, driving a truck and working in a factory. Upon completing his education Amarjot worked as a computer engineer, a network analyst, and a realtor for Royal Lepage, before finally being elected as a Member of Provincial Parliament.

Political Life 
Amarjot was always passionate about politics even before arriving in Canada, Amarjot and his  family were involved in politics in India. In Canada, Amarjot found there to be many good opportunities to get involved in politics as well through the likes of volunteering and canvassing. Amarjot started his political career as a volunteer in conservative politics in 2008 and after 10 years of volunteer experience, he felt ready for taking the next steps.

Amarjot always planned on running for office and after acquiring his Canadian Citizenship in 2016 he decided to contest the nomination to be the Ontario PC Party candidate in Brampton West and eventually Amarjot was elected as the MPP of Brampton West in the 2018 provincial election.

Amarjot Sandhu is currently the Chair of the Standing Committee on Finance and Economic Affairs. In this role, he oversees the committee and has had the privilege of hearing from businesses across the province and what the provincial government can do to support them. He has been sitting as the Member of Provincial Parliament since winning his seat in the 2018 Ontario Provincial Election.

Sandhu is also a Member of the Standing Committee on General Government. Amarjot Sandhu was appointed by Ontario's Premier Doug Ford to serve as the parliamentary assistant to the Minister of Infrastructure Kinga Surma.

42nd Parliament 
Sandhu served as a member of the Standing Committee on Regulations and Private Bills from July 26, 2018 - October 28, 2019. Amarjot also served as Chair of the Standing Committee on Finance and Economic Affairs from October 28, 2019 - October 20, 2021. He is currently serving as a member of both the Standing Committee on Public Accounts and Standing Committee on General Government. On July 9, 2021, Amarjot Sandhu began serving as the parliamentary assistant to the Minister of Infrastructure. In June 2019, after talking to constituents Amarjot tabled a motion to resume the environmental assessment of Highway 413. Highway 413 would be a 60 kilometre freeway connecting Milton from Highway 401 to Highway 400 in Vaughn. The previous Liberal government cancelled the proposal. During his time as the chair of the Standing Committee of Finance and Economic Affairs Amarjot met with many constituents and stake holders during the COVID-19 pandemic to better understand the economic and financial impacts that COVID-19 had on businesses and residents throughout the province. Amarjot chaired the Standing Committee of Finance and Economic Affairs to break the record for the number of hours spent in committee meetings. This committee spent hundreds of hours in session virtually.

Election results

References

External links

21st-century Canadian politicians
Canadian politicians of Indian descent
Canadian real estate agents
Living people
Politicians from Brampton
Progressive Conservative Party of Ontario MPPs
Year of birth missing (living people)
Jat
Canadian politicians of Punjabi descent
Punjabi people
George Brown College alumni